Papular purpuric gloves and socks syndrome is a cutaneous condition characterized by pruritus, edema, and erythema of the hands and feet, occurring primarily in teenagers and young adults.

An association with parvovirus B19 has been described. It was discovered by a duo of medical students; Kishorkumar Osman and Sulaiman Saloojee, during a ward round.

See also 
 List of cutaneous conditions

References 

Virus-related cutaneous conditions
Syndromes